The Bahrain Petroleum Company (BAPCO) is an integrated national oil company of Bahrain.

History

The BAPCO was established in 1929 in Canada by Standard Oil Company of California for oil exploration activities in Bahrain. It took over Bahrain's assets of Gulf Oil. In 1930 it obtained the only oil concession in Bahrain. BAPCO discovered first oil in 1931. On 31 May 1932, the company discovered the Bahrain Field (Awali Field). After exporting oil and constructing a refinery, it started with  refining capacity in 1936. Later that year the Standard Oil Company of California signed an agreement with Texaco, which acquired a half of BAPCO's shares. In 1975 more than 60% BAPCO's shares was acquired by the Government of Bahrain. In 1980, all BAPCO's shares were taken over by the Government of Bahrain. In 1978 the oil sector was nationalized and BAPCO assumed full control of the national energy sector. In 1999, the current Bahrain Petroleum Company was created when the Bahrain National Oil Company, established in 1976, merged with BAPCO. In 2018 BAPCO commissioned a new pipeline that replaced the over 70 years old pipeline infrastructure between Bahrain and Saudi Arabia. In March 2019 construction work was started to upgrade the main oil refinery Sitra. Currently Abdulrahman Jawahery serves as CEO of the BAPCO.

Operations
BAPCO is an integrated oil company operating in the field of refining, and marketing. It operates a   oil refinery which lies midway between the original BAPCO expat workers accommodation township of Awali and Sitra. About one-sixth of this crude originates from the Bahrain Field, with the remainder being pumped from Saudi Arabia. Saudi Aramco supplies approximately  through the  pipeline from Aramco's Abqaiq Plant. Once the flagship Sitra refinery's expansion is completed in 2023, its capacity will be increased from 267,000 bpd to 380,000 bpd.

References

External links

National oil and gas companies
Non-renewable resource companies established in 1929
Oil companies of Bahrain
Energy companies established in 1929
Standard Oil